Shukladhwaja (Pron:ʃʊkləˈdwɑːdʒ) (1510-1577AD), or more popularly known as Bir Chilarai(Pron:/ʧɪləˌraɪ/), was the 3rd son of Biswa Singha, founder of the Koch Dynasty in Kamata Kingdom and younger brother of Nara Narayan, the 2nd king of the Koch dynasty of the Kamata kingdom in the 16th century. He was Nara Narayan's commander-in-chief and chief Minister (Dewan) of the kingdom. He got his name Chilarai because, as a general, he executed troop movements that were as fast as a chila (kite/Eagle).

Biography
Chilaray was the third son of Biswa Singha (1515–1540). 

It was only due to his royal patronage that Sankardeva was able to establish the ekasarana-namadharma in Assam and bring about his cultural renaissance. Several rulers, namely the then king of Manipur and the Khasi tribal chief (Viryyavanta), submitted to Chilaray. Chilaray and his army also vanquished and killed the Jaintia king, and kings of Tippera (Tripura) and Sylhet. Chilaray is said to have never committed brutalities on unarmed common people, and even those kings who surrendered were treated with respect. He was harsh to kings and soldiers who refused to surrender, but neither him nor his brother ever annexed territories or oppressed the common people. They only collected tributes from the vanquished kings. They even treated enemy prisoners kindly, and gave them land-grants to settle.

The duo (Chilaray and Nara Narayan) turned towards Bengal, but unforeseen circumstances led to Chilaray's capture by the Afghan Sultan Sulaiman Khan Karrani, while Naranarayan retreated to his capital. Much of the Koch kingdom was then captured by the Afghans.

Chilaray died in 1577 of small pox on the bank of Ganges.

Bir Chilaray Divas
The birth anniversary of Mahabir Chilaray is organised by Government of Assam annually from 2005. The Government also declares this day as state holiday. It is celebrated on the Purnima of Phagun Maah of Hindu Calendar.

Bir Chilaray award
The Directorate of Cultural Affairs, Government of Assam instituted these awards in 2005. Theycomprise a shawl, a citation, and a cash award of Rs. 100,000

Notes

References
 
 
 
 

16th-century Indian people
People from Assam